Hans-Peter Stratz (born 20 April 1950) is a German wrestler. He competed in the men's freestyle 100 kg at the 1976 Summer Olympics.

References

1950 births
Living people
German male sport wrestlers
Olympic wrestlers of West Germany
Wrestlers at the 1976 Summer Olympics
Sportspeople from Freiburg im Breisgau